Grégory Lazitch (born 26 May 1992) is a Belgian professional footballer who plays for RAAL La Louvière in the Belgian Division 2 as a left-back.

Career
Lazitch made his Belgian Pro League debut for Sporting Charleroi as a 16-year-old on 13 December 2008 against Genk. He came on as a substitute in the 17th minute for the injured Orlando. Through three seasons, he made 16 appearances in the Pro League for the club.

After the club suffered relegation to the Second Division, Lazitch was a starter in the first two league games of the 2011–12 season against Tienen and Roeselare – but in August 2011 he was sent on loan to Virton as part of the permanent move of Harlem Gnohéré from Virton to Charleroi. After his loan spell, he was mostly a reserve under head coach Yannick Ferrera, after the club had returned to the Pro League, after which he signed a permanent deal with White Star Bruxelles in 2013.

Lazitch began playing for La Louvière Centre in 2015, and moved to RAAL La Louvière in 2018.

References

1992 births
Living people
Belgian footballers
R. Charleroi S.C. players
R.E. Virton players
RWS Bruxelles players
Belgian Pro League players
Challenger Pro League players
Sportspeople from Charleroi
Footballers from Hainaut (province)
Association football defenders
UR La Louvière Centre players
RAAL La Louvière players
C.S. Visé players